Thomas Delves may refer to:

Sir Thomas Delves, 1st Baronet (1571–1658) High Sheriff of Cheshire, of the Delves Baronets
Sir Thomas Delves, 3rd Baronet (1630–1713) High Sheriff of Cheshire, of the Delves Baronets
Sir Thomas Delves, 4th Baronet (1652–1727), of the Delves Baronets

See also
Delves (disambiguation)